Bucheon FC 1995 (Hangul: 부천 FC 1995) is a South Korean professional football club based in Bucheon that competes in the K League 2, the second tier of South Korean football. The club was founded in 2007 by a group of former Bucheon SK supporters after its move to Jeju in early 2006.

History

Within weeks of the relocation of Bucheon SK, fans started a movement to form a brand new team in Bucheon, with an initial goal of creating a team to participate in the 2007 Korea National League season. The financial requirements for entry to the National League were so great and that, coupled with the launch of the K3 League in 2007, led to them readjusting their target and focusing on entry to the K3 League in 2008.

During the course of 2007, deals with several major sponsors, including Sportstoto, Daum and SK Energy, were negotiated. On 25 October 2007, the club's name, Bucheon FC 1995, was announced, and the club was officially founded on 1 December.

Bucheon FC 1995 became a professional club and got an approval to join the second tier K League Challenge on 5 December 2012. In their first season as a professional club, they finished in seventh place.

Players

Current squad

Out on loan

Records

Season-by-season

Key
Tms. = Number of teams
Pos. = Position in league

References

External links

 Bucheon FC 1995 official website 

 
K League 2 clubs
K3 League (2007–2019) clubs
Association football clubs established in 2007
Fan-owned football clubs
Sport in Gyeonggi Province
Bucheon
2007 establishments in South Korea